Anna-Maria Shatokhin (born 2 April 2007) is a German rhythmic gymnast. She represents her country in international competitions.

Career

Junior 
Anna-Maria debuted nationally in 2017 when she competed in the national finals of individual rhythmic gymnastics, ending 7th in the All-Around, 5th with clubs and won bronze in free hands. A year later she was 6th with ball, 5th with hoop and the All-Around.

She participated in the pre junior category at the 2019 German championships, being 6th with ribbon, 4th with clubs and won silver in free hands. In 2020 she took part in the selection for the junior European Championships in Kyiv, in the end the German delegation did not take part because of the Covid-19 pandemic, she was 7th in the All-Around. In 2021 Shatokhin was part of the German junior group that competed at the European Championships in Varna, they were 13th in the All-Around, 11th with 5 balls and 16th with 5 ribbons.

In 2022 she competed in the first national qualifier for the European Championships in Tel Aviv, she was 2nd in the All-Around behind Lada Pusch. In April at the second event she topped the All-Around before Pusch and Viktoria Steinfeld. She then won the under 15 qualification for the German Championships. On the 28th of May Anna-Maria won bronze at nationals behind Niki Gotschewa and Mia Sophie Lietke, the next day she won bronze with ball, silver with clubs and ribbon and gold with hoop. In June she represented Germany at the European Championships along Pusch, they were 6th in teams, Shatokhin competed with clubs and ribbon ending 9th and 4th.

Senior 
Anna-Maria became a senior in 2023, debuting at the "Swirl and Twirl" International Tournament in Udine where she finished 3rd in the All-Around. In March she took part in the Fellnach-Schmiden Tournament taking the 5th place in the All-Around.

Routine music information

References 

2007 births
Living people
German rhythmic gymnasts
21st-century German women